Charles of Bourbon Visiting St Peter's Basilica is an oil on canvas painting by Italian artist Giovanni Paolo Pannini, commissioned by its subject Charles of Bourbon in 1746 and completed later that year. It was part of the commission as the same artist's Charles of Bourbon Visiting Pope Benedict XIV at the Coffee House del Quirinale and both works are now in the National Museum of Capodimonte in Naples.

History and description
The painting portrayed the visit of the king Charles III of Spain to Pope Benedict XIV, in Rome, with whom he had close friendship since the signature of the Agreement of 1741, after the victory of the Bourbon troops over the Austrian ones in 1744 in Velletri..The canvas was originally in the Capodimonte Palace, it was moved to the Palazzo degli Studi in 1806, and in 1957 returned to the newborn National Museum of Capodimonte, where it is exhibited in room 32, in the area of ​​the Royal Apartment.

The painting portrays King Charles III on horseback, showing a brilliant and worldly enthusiasm, followed by the greatest personalities of Spain, in front of the facade of St. Peter's Basilica in the Vatica. The painter himself was an eyewitness to this event. At the center of the work are depicted the leading figures, surrounded by a multitude of people, with the aim of giving even greater prominence to the main scene, while in the background, the papal palaces are painted in a way as to create an excellent perspective illusion.

References

Bibliography
Mario Sapio, Il Museo di Capodimonte, Naples, Arte'm, 2012. 
Touring Club Italiano, Museo di Capodimonte, Milan, Touring Club Editore, 2012. 

1746 paintings
Paintings in the collection of the Museo di Capodimonte
History paintings
St. Peter's Basilica
Churches in art
Paintings by Giovanni Paolo Panini
Cultural depictions of Spanish kings